Chilnualna Falls is a series of waterfalls totaling 690 feet (210 m), located on Chilnualna Creek in the southern section of Yosemite National Park.

The falls are a popular horseback riding destination. Chilnualna Falls consists of five tiers ranging from 30 to 300 feet (9–91 m) in height. The first tier is 90–120 feet (27–36 m) high. The second is a 30-foot (9 m) high cascade. The third and largest is 300 feet (91 m) high. The fourth is 60 feet (18 m) high. The final tier is a 180–210 foot (54–64 m) high cascade.

The trailhead to the falls is in the eastern extremity of Wawona, at the end of Chilnualna Creek Road.  The trailhead elevation is approximately 4,000 feet (1,200 m), and the trail reaches the main portion of the waterfall at 6,200 feet (1,900 m).

External links
 

Waterfalls of Yosemite National Park
Waterfalls of Mariposa County, California
Tiered waterfalls